By Way of the Drum is the thirteenth studio album by the American funk rock band Funkadelic. It was recorded between 1983 and 1985 (with the title track being released as a single [MCA 23953] for MCA Records in 1989), but shelved until its release in 2007 on Hip-O Select. The original sessions were produced by George Clinton, while Harry Weinger and Alan Leeds serve as compilation producers.

Track listing 
 "Nose Bleed" (Clinton, McKnight) – 5:44
 "Sunshine of Your Love" (Pete Brown, Jack Bruce, Eric Clapton) – 5:26
 "Freaks Bearing Gifts" (Clinton, Shider, Spradley) – 6:01
 "YaDaDaDa" (Collins, Lewis) – 5:07
 "By Way of the Drum" (Clinton, Shider, Spradley) – 5:59
 "Jugular" (a.k.a. "Juggler") (McKnight) – 5:57
 "Some Fresh Delic" (Clinton, Hazel, McKnight) – 5:25
 "Primal Instinct" (Barsha, Clinton, Gambas, Jones) – 4:53

Bonus tracks
 "By Way of the Drum" (Extended Version) (Clinton, Shider, Spradley) – 9:17
 "By Way of the Drum" (Dub) (Clinton, Shider, Spradley) – 6:55
 "By Way of the Drum" (Basstrumental) (Clinton, Shider, Spradley) – 6:11
 "By Way of the Drum" (Acappella) (Clinton, Shider, Spradley) – 5:50

Personnel 
 George Clinton
 DeWayne "Blackbyrd" McKnight
 Eddie Hazel
 Frank Colon
 David Spradley
 Donnie Sterling
 Loic Gambas
 Garry Shider
 Amp Fiddler
 Mallia Franklin
 Tracey Lewis

Notes

Further reading 
 Michael Endelman, Funkadelic 1984, Entertainment Weekly, December 3, 2004.
 Funkadelic - By Way Of The Drum, All Things Deep, 2007.

Funkadelic albums
2007 albums
Albums with cover art by Pedro Bell